Laboissière-en-Thelle is a commune in the Oise department in northern France. Laboissière-Le Déluge station has rail connections to Beauvais and Paris.

See also
 Communes of the Oise department

References

Communes of Oise